Deathbed phenomena refers to a range of experiences reported by people who are dying. There are many examples of deathbed phenomena in both non-fiction and fictional literature, which suggests that these occurrences have been noted by cultures around the world for centuries, although scientific study of them is relatively recent. In scientific literature such experiences have been referred to as death-related sensory experiences (DRSE). Dying patients have reported to staff working in hospices they have experienced comforting visions.

Modern scientists consider deathbed phenomena and visions to be hallucinations.

Deathbed visions 

Deathbed visions have been described since ancient times. However, the first systematic study was not conducted until the 20th century. They have also been referred to as veridical hallucinations, visions of the dying and predeath visions. The physician William Barrett, author of the book Death-Bed Visions (1926), collected anecdotes of people who had claimed to have experienced visions of deceased friends and relatives, the sound of music and other deathbed phenomena. Barrett was a Christian spiritualist and believed the visions were evidence for spirit communication.

In a study conducted between 1959 and 1973 by the parapsychologists Karlis Osis and Erlendur Haraldsson, they reported that 50% of the tens of thousands of individuals they studied in the United States and India had experienced deathbed visions. Osis, Haraldsson and other parapsychologists such as Raymond Moody have interpreted the reports as evidence for an afterlife.

The neurologist Terence Hines has written that the proponents of the afterlife interpretation grossly underestimate the variability among the reports. Hines also criticized their methodology of collecting the reports:

The skeptical investigator Joe Nickell has written deathbed visions (DBVs) are based on anecdotal accounts that are unreliable. In not reviewing the entire context of accounts he believed he had discovered contradictions and inconsistencies in various DBVs reported by the paranormal author Carla Wills-Brandon.

Research within the Hospice & Palliative Care fields have studied the impact of deathbed phenomena (DBP) on the dying, their families, and palliative staff. In 2009, a questionnaire was distributed to 111 staff in an Irish hospice program asking if they had encountered staff or patients who had experienced DBP. The majority of respondents that they had been informed of a deathbed vision by a patient or the patient's family. They reported that the content of these visions often seemed to be comforting to the patient and their family. Another study found that DBPs are commonly associated with peaceful death and are generally under-reported by patients and families due to fear of embarrassment and disbelief from medical staff.

In response to this qualitative data, there is a growing movement within the palliative care field that emphasizes "compassionate understanding and respect from those who provide end of life care" in regards to DBPs.

According to DRSE researchers, such as Peter Fenwick (neuropsychologist), the common experiences include; a visual or auditory vision of (usually deceased) loved ones (most commonly parents), visions of a brightly colored 'afterlife' realm (usually a garden), a vision of light (often personified as important spiritual figures in the dying patient's spiritual or religious beliefs), and a 'letting go' of one's personal attachments, and personal identity (ego) as a whole, termed ego death in some psychedelic communities.

Along with these personal experiences from the dying themselves, occasionally loved ones and hospice nurses experience similar things as well, termed 'Deathbed coincidences by researchers such as the aforementioned Peter Fenwick (neuropsychologist). Included in this wide branch of interpersonal death-related phenomena includes; alleged knowledge of one's passing through a 'visitation' before being told by others (often with the experiencer across a large distance from the dying individual and supposedly having no prior knowledge of the individual's condition or death), experiences of light protruding from the patient's body (often interpreted as a soul) and 'heavenly music' coinciding with the patient's death. Along with this comes an experience known in parapsychology as 'Shared Death Experiences', an experience in which a bystander, a friend, relative, nurse or other have an experience that is similar to a Near Death Experience, but from the perspective of accompanying the dying individual.

Some parapsychologists Raymond Moody, Peter Fenwick (neuropsychologist), William Peters (Head of Shared Crossing Research Initiative), have interpreted these reports as evidence for an afterlife, pointing out there similarities to near death experiences. Limited skepticism has come to these claims so far, except from the psychological truism arguments from Joe Nickell and philosopher Keith Augustine. As of yet, there remains very few research projects into these shared DRSE phenomena, and thus neither the paranormal 'afterlife' nor the neurobiological or psychological approaches can be supported.

Terminal lucidity 

Sometimes, people with severe mental impairments, usually victims of neurodegenerative diseases, recover their cognitive functions shortly before death.

Scientific evaluation 

According to Ronald K. Siegel, noted American psychopharmacologist and researcher, there is a high degree of similarity between deathbed visions and drug-induced hallucinations. Hallucinations caused by drugs frequently contain images of otherworldly beings and deceased friends and relatives. Some scientists who have studied cases of deathbed phenomena have described the visual, auditory, and sensed presences of deceased relatives or angelic beings during the dying process as hallucinations. These hallucinations are theorized to occur due to a number of explanations including but not limited to cerebral hypoxia, confusion, delirium, body systems failures (e.g., renal, hepatic, pulmonary), and a mental reaction to stress.

When the brain does not have adequate blood flow, as is the case when someone suffers from cardiac arrest, the brain is deprived of oxygen. A short period of cerebral hypoxia can result in the impairment of neuronal function. It is theorized that this neuronal impairment accounts for deathbed visions.

See also
Deathbed confession
Deathbed conversion

References 
 

Afterlife
Death
Near-death experiences
Paranormal terminology
Parapsychology